We Cry Out: The Worship Project is the seventh studio album from contemporary Christian musician Jeremy Camp. It was released on August 24, 2010, and peaked at No. 1 on the Billboard Christian Albums Charts and No. 15 on the Billboard 200.

Track listing

The deluxe edition of We Cry Out features three acoustic versions of songs from the album, and one new song.

Personnel 

 Jeremy Camp – lead vocals, background vocals, co-producer
 Randy Williams – electric guitar
 Andy Davis – electric guitar
 Jerry McPherson – electric guitar
 Scott Denté – acoustic guitar
 Jacob Sooter – piano and keyboards
 Blair Masters – piano and keyboards
 Brown Bannister – piano, keyboards, additional programming, percussion, producer, overdub recording engineer
 Walton B. Smith – bass 
 Leif Skartland – drums
 Ken Lewis – percussion
 Eric Darken – percussion
 Adrienne Camp – background vocals
 Luke Brown – background vocals
 Debi Selby – choir on "Jesus Saves", "Overcome", and "Mighty to Save"
 Michelle Swift – choir on "Jesus Saves", "Overcome", and "Mighty to Save"
 Terry White – choir on "Jesus Saves", "Overcome", and "Mighty to Save"
 Aimee Joy Weimer – choir on "Jesus Saves", "Overcome", and "Mighty to Save"
 Jennifer Paige – choir on "Jesus Saves", "Overcome", and "Mighty to Save"
 Missi Hale – choir on "Jesus Saves", "Overcome", and "Mighty to Save"
 Felicia Wolfe – choir on "Jesus Saves", "Overcome", and "Mighty to Save"
 Tom Lane – choir on "Jesus Saves", "Overcome", and "Mighty to Save"
 Joy of Africa Choir – choir on "The Way"
 Hector Mjana – Joy of Africa Choir director
 Brad Peens – Joy of Africa Choir director

Production

 Brandon Ebel – executive producer
 Tyson Paoletti – executive producer, A&R
 Steve Bishir – tracking at Dark Horse Recording Studio, Franklin, Tennessee
 Colin Heldt – tracking assistant
 Nick Kallstrom – tracking assistant
 Billy Whittington – overdub recording engineer
 Doug Sarrett – overdub recording engineer
 Colin Heldt – overdub recording engineer
 John Bannister – digital editing
 Billy Whittington – digital editing
 Buckley Miller – digital editing
 Chuck Butler – digital editing
 Dave Dillbeck – digital editing
 Robin Ghosh – digital editing
 Rob Williams – audio engineer for Joy of Africa Choir, at Fountaineye Studios, Port Elizabeth, South Africa
 J. R. McNeely – audio engineer, at Elm South Studios, Franklin, Tennessee
 Adam Hall – assistant audio engineer
 Chris Lord-Alge – mixing ("Jesus Saves" and "Not Ashamed") at Mix LA
 Kirk Armstrong – mixing assistant ("Jesus Saves" and "Not Ashamed") 
 Nik Karpen – mixing assistant ("Jesus Saves" and "Not Ashamed") 
 Brad Townsend – additional mixing assistant ("Jesus Saves" and "Not Ashamed")
 Andrew Schubert – additional mixing assistant ("Jesus Saves" and "Not Ashamed")
 Ted Jensen – mastering at Sterling Sound, New York City
 Brian Kroll – A&R assistant
 Jordan Butcher – art direction and design
 Laura Dart – artist photography

Accolades

The album was nominated for two Dove Awards: Praise & Worship Album of the Year and Recorded Music Packaging of the Year (for the Deluxe Edition), at the 42nd GMA Dove Awards.

References

Jeremy Camp albums
BEC Recordings albums
2010 albums